Scopula crassipuncta is a moth of the family Geometridae. It was discovered by Warren in 1901. It is endemic to Angola.

References

Endemic fauna of Angola
Insects of Angola
Moths described in 1901
Moths of Africa
crassipuncta
Taxa named by William Warren (entomologist)